Duvillard Mill is a historic grist mill located at Cape Vincent in Jefferson County, New York.  It was built in 1856 and is a -story, limestone structure with Stick style decoration.  Originally a grist mill, it was later a shingle and planing mill.  It has been remodeled for use as an aquarium and museum.

It was listed on the National Register of Historic Places in 1985.

References

Grinding mills on the National Register of Historic Places in New York (state)
Buildings and structures in Jefferson County, New York
Grinding mills in New York (state)
National Register of Historic Places in Jefferson County, New York
1856 establishments in New York (state)
Buildings and structures completed in 1856